Amaryllo Inc. is a multinational company founded in Amsterdam, the Netherlands, operating in AI as a Service market. It develops biometric robotic technologies, real-time data mining, a camera robot, fast object recognition, an encrypted P2P network, and flexible cloud storage.

Amaryllo was founded by Band of Angels member, Marcus Yang to develop patents for a new type of robotic cameras that is claimed to "talk, hear, sense, recognize human faces, and track intruders". It also claims to have made the world's first security robot based on the WebRTC protocol, icam PRO FHD, and won the 2015 CES Best of Innovation Award under Embedded Technology category. Its home security robots claim to employ 256-bit encryption and run on the WebRTC protocol. Amaryllo products are sold in over 100 Countries across 6 Continents.

History
Amaryllo revealed its first smart home security products at Internationale Funkausstellung Berlin (IFA) 2013 with a Skype-enabled IP camera called iCam HD. Amaryllo announced its second Skype-certified smart home product, iBabi HD, at CES 2014. The company was chosen as a "Cool Vendor" by Gartner in Connected Home 2014. Amaryllo introduced WebRTC-based smart home products after Microsoft terminated embedded Skype services in mid 2014. Since then, Amaryllo has been developing a camera robots with auto-tracking and facial recognition technologies. Its camera robots, ATOM AR3 and ATOM AR3S, were introduced in late 2016. It focuses on wired and wireless technology based on AI services.

Biometric Robotic Technologies

Facial Recognition
Amaryllo debuted its facial recognition technologies on the new auto-tracking model, ATOM at IFA 2016. ATOM is designed to recognize human faces from learning faces. It claims to take 0.5 seconds to detect a human face and another 0.5 second to identify a person, totaling 1 second to recognize a human face. It can recognize over 100 people simultaneously. ASUS SmartHome platform has integrated ATOM.

Embedded Auto-Tracking
Amaryllo uses a multi-core processor embedded in cameras to make tracking systems in single units. Amaryllo security drones act as individual security robots to track moving objects without many commands from remote computers. With a 1920 x 1080 resolution, they claim to be able to track intruders over 30 feet away. Infrared lights are aesthetically hidden by a mask and are activated when the environment becomes dark, so that they can manage to work in darkness.

Multiple Sensor Network
The drones have multiple motion sensors around them for "360-degree" tracking, once a sensor is triggered, embedded CPUs will guide the drones to turn to the spotted direction to follow objects. This can use multiple cameras in a single unit to reduce cost. These robots even claim to "talk to intruders if they are spotted" and track intruders.

Object Recognition
Amaryllo develops cloud-based artificial intelligence with its camera robots to recognize objects like faces, human body, vehicle, animals, airplanes, etc.,. It uses "real-time picture frame analysis" to identify over 100 human faces within seconds. Once a human-like face is recognized, robots deliver face snapshots to smart devices. This patent-pending method claims to eliminate possible false alerts generated by Passive infrared sensors.

Interactive Services 
Amaryllo robots are linked to Google Services. These robots can alertabout emails, appointments, say "Hello", "Good Morning", "Good Afternoon", etc. when they detect events like motion, audio, or face detection pre-determined by users. They are wirelessly connected to networks, so they are aware of local time and can report time on an hourly fashion, acting as a regular clock. More interactive voice communications are reported.

P2P Communications and Cloud Service

Dynamic P2P Server
Amaryllo was the first to "establish global Peer-to-Peer (P2P) server based on WebRTC protocol in smart home service". Amaryllo Live is a plug-in-free H.264-based browser service to access their cameras over the Internet. It runs on WebRTC protocol and was initially supported by Firefox. Other browsers have vowed to support the WebRTC H.264-based codec.

Video Alert
Amaryllo offers free and paid cloud storage plans including video alerts for urgent video messages from smart devices. Amaryllo launched Urgent Home Care Service with an introduction of iCare FHD, which give alerts based on remote devices. It can detect faces and sends real-time face alert video to family members.

Data Analytics Service

Soteria
Amaryllo expanded its business to B2B smart retailers by introducing Soteria service in 2018, which claims to "employ biometric analytics cameras with cloud intelligence".

Amaryllo Cloud Storage (ACS) 
Amaryllo Cloud is Amaryllo's dedicated cloud storage service, which began in January, 2021. The service is available on Windows, Android, Linux, and iOS via browser or Amaryllo Cloud App. The service is also scheduled to be available in VR via Metaverse starting 2022.

Account Options 
Amaryllo Cloud offers multiple account types including free accounts and monthly, yearly, and lifetime storage plans.

 Free Accounts  10GB.
 Monthly Plans  100GB to 10TB.
 Annual Plans  100GB to 10TB.
 Lifetime Plans  50GB to 10TB.

Features 
Users can share storage with up to nine other people and it claims to offer unlimited bandwidth.

Encryption 
Amaryllo Cloud claims to use "AES 256-bit encryption", the claim not being independently verifiable due to Amaryllo intentionally hiding the source code of their closed-source products.

References 

Robotics organizations
Home automation companies